Ian Chang (born 10 October 1988) is a musician, drummer, and producer. He is the drummer of the American experimental rock band Son Lux and Landlady.

As a solo artist, he has recorded three solo EPs: Spiritual Leader (2017), Romeo Remixes (2018), and Inhaler Remixes (2018), and released his debut full-length album 属 Belonging in 2020. Chang has also worked with musicians Moses Sumney, Joan as Policewoman, Matthew Dear, Kazu Makino, Dave Douglas, and Chvrches.

Career
As a child, Chang studied classical piano and percussion at the Hong Kong Academy for Performing Arts. He and his family moved to New Jersey in 2007 where he continued studying music and exploring New York City. He attended New York University where he received an undergraduate degree in jazz drumming in 2011. 

Chang began playing in the band Landlady in 2010 and by 2015 he was a key part of Son Lux and traveling in Europe with noted jazz musicians. He was a member of Body Language from 2010-2016. Chang lives in Dallas, Texas where he continues to explore an "international musical language."

Discography

As Ian Chang
 Spiritual Leader (2017)
 Romeo Remixes (2018)
 Inhaler Remixes (2018)
 Belonging (2020)

With Son Lux
 Bones (2015) – 12" vinyl, CD, digital – Glassnote
 Stranger Forms (2016) – digital – Glassnote
 Brighter Wounds (City Slang, 2018)
 Tomorrows I (City Slang, 2020)
 Tomorrows II (City Slang, 2020)
 Tomorrows III (City Slang, 2021)

Soundtracks
 Son Lux, Original Score for "Everything Everywhere All at Once" (2021)

References

External links 
 

1988 births
Living people
21st-century American drummers
Hong Kong drummers